Blaster Bates was the name used by Derek Macintosh Bates (5 February 1923 – 1 September 2006), an English explosives and demolition expert and raconteur, who was born in Crewe. He made a series of sound recordings from the 1960s to 1980s, recounting bizarre and funny experiences from his long career, and tales of his hobbies of motorcycling, hunting and shooting. He was much in demand as an after-dinner speaker. His tales often featured coarse language. Once, for instance, he was hired to clear out a farm's septic tank using explosives, an episode Bates described as "The Shower of Shit Over Cheshire". On another occasion he surprised a young couple in what he described as 'a compromising position' whilst clearing trees for the Oulton Park racing circuit, an incident which gave the Knickerbrook corner its name.

Bates served with the Royal Air Force during the Second World War as a Handley Page Halifax bomber pilot, and then learned his explosives skills as a bomb disposal specialist. After the war he returned to his previous employer Rolls-Royce, hoping to resume his old job, but was told "We're cutting down, you know". Bates then started his own demolition business, drawing on his wartime expertise. He later noted that it was a good decision, as "over the years I've managed to do all right while Rolls-Royce have gone steadily bust".

He was known for carrying sticks of explosive in his pockets, even producing them while giving testimony in trials, to the horror of the court. Most high explosives are harmless unless used with a detonator, but this is not generally understood.

Bates had diabetes. In August 2006 he was admitted to hospital with congestive heart failure, and on 1 September 2006 he died, aged 83. He was buried at St Mary's church in Sandbach town centre.

Recordings
Currently available CD re-releases in the UK.
Laughter with a Bang +bonus tracks from 1001 Gelignites (CD BBCD01) (2003) Label: Topic Records
TNT for Two +bonus tracks from Hunting and Shooting stories (CD BBSV17) (2003) Label : Big Ben / Tangent
Watch out for the bits +bonus tracks from Gelly Babe (CD BVBSV16) (2002) Label : Big Ben
Blastermind  +bonus tracks from Lift off (CD BBSV18) (2007) Label: Big Ben / Tangent

Original LP & Cassette Releases Label – Big Ben 
Vol1 Laughter with a bang BB00.01/BBMC1 Mono 1967
Vol2 1001 Gelignites BB00.03/BBMC3 Mono 1968
Vol3 TNT for Two BB00.05/BBMC5 Mono 1969
Vol4 Watch out for the bits BB00.07/BBMC7 Mono 1971
Vol5 Lift-off BB00.09/BBMC9 Stereo 1973
Vol6 Gelly Babe BB00.11/BBMC11 Stereo 1975
Vol7 Blastermind BB00.13/BBMC13 Stereo 1980
Vol8 Hunting and Shooting stories BB00.15/BBMC15 Stereo 1984

Video
Stand Well Back (VHS Video, PAL format, UK only) – live on stage

Other known recordings
Dunlop footwear Promo, extracts from Lift-off on Flexi-disk, given away at stand 36, Harrogate 1978.
Blast it, (Cassette only) compilation.
Blaster Bates with Redditch Controls, Marston Paxman and Norgren at the Stratford Hilton.
Recorded March 1977 and given away as Christmas gift to Imperial Metal Industries staff and customers (Label – Tangent).

Bootlegs
Blaster Bates at Huntingdon hall 4 October 2003.

Book

BBC TV Appearances or Contributions
24 Hours 08-March-1966 LCA7927J.
Nelson's Pillar in Dublin blown up, after the top was blown off by the IRA. Reporter Alan Whicker. Compilation on demolition.
It takes all sorts 13-03-1967 19SX8562.
Blaster talks about his career. Includes many of his amusing anecdotes. Interviewer: John Hosken.
Now aged 43. Got into demolition by accident. In RAF during the war & learned about explosives there. Now blows up all sorts of things: 
"I've got a touch like a bloody midwife".
Art of getting chimneys to drop in exactly the right place.
Has blown himself up – was playing about.
Has put rockets on the back of a motorcycle.
Look North 14-Dec-1970 A:RNL5186T.
Blaster talks to David Seymour about his career and about how many chimneys he's blown up.
Nationwide 25-March-1974 A:LCA3413R.
Blaster demolishes three chimneys. 
Old factory chimney, camera pans from l to 2 others.
Blaster arrives, Danger Demolition signs. 
Crowd watch. 
Blaster retreats.
Blast & 1st chimney falls. 
Crowd reaction.
Blaster & assistant run from behind stack.
Blast & it falls neatly behind wall.
Look Stranger – The world of Blaster Bates 6 May 1974 LGF6321T.
Film about Derek 'Blaster Bates' one of England's leading professional destroyers, who travels the country blasting chimneys, bridges & redundant factories, clearing trenches & canals; he is also a comedian using experience as a blaster.
The Fivepenny Piece Show 11 May 1979 NMRD805R.
An Outside Broadcast concert from the Poco-a-Poco Theatre Club in Stockport. Fivepenny Piece sing some of their own songs with Blaster as special guest.
Nationwide 17 March 1983 D:LCAC311E.
Hugh Scully reports on how Blaster makes a living by blowing up chimneys.
News 30 September 1983 ANBC773T.
Blaster demolished a chimney which has been part of Sheffield skyline since 1870. 
Sheffield: ms chimney with group of people standing nearby. 
Man starts dominoes falling on model of chimney, the dominos set off some gelignite which demolished model chimney. 
Actual chimney being demolished.
Look North 30 September 1983 RNLF739L,
John Thirlwell reports from Sheffield where a former BSC chimney is being demolished for an extension to Whitbread's brewery. 
from chimney, Bridge Street, Sheffield to marquee.
Inside of marquee with Michael Cairney preparing dominoes.
Blaster explaining charges & spectator.
Blaster saying he does not like dominoes.
Dominoes falling in chair & igniting.
Chimney falls.
Pebble Mill at One 25 October 1985 E:NBMH111D.
Josephine Buchan talks to Blaster about the 75th Anniversary of the motorbike & the present exhibition at the NEC.
Windmill-House and home 3 November 1985 LCHE133D.
Demolition montage and clip of a Blaster after dinner speech.
Look North 25 November 1985 RNLH348L.
Ken Cooper reports from Sharlston where Blaster demolished a large chimney – including interview with Blaster.
Gosling's Ganders 15 May 1987 RNWC738D.
Ray Gosling meets Blaster at Sandbach & explodes marsh land to make a pond. Blaster tells jokes and clip from The Fivepenny Piece Show.
Coast to Coast – Wild boars, a shooting star and a Norman knight 27 February 1998 NMYK291D.

References

External links

http://www.bbc.co.uk/radio4/news/lastword_15sept2006.shtml
Obituary in The Independent

1923 births
2006 deaths
British World War II pilots
British World War II bomber pilots
Deaths from diabetes
English male comedians
People from Crewe
Burials in Cheshire
20th-century English comedians